Audrey Wurdemann Auslander (January 1, 1911 – May 20, 1960) was an American poet. She was the youngest winner of the Pulitzer Prize for Poetry at the age of 24, for her collection Bright Ambush.

Biography
Wurdemann was born in Seattle, Washington. She claimed to be the great-great-granddaughter of Percy Bysshe Shelley, but no Shelley lineage can be connected to her family. She never attended grammar school, and entered Lakeside High School at the age of 11.

Her first collection of poetry, 'The House of Silk' was published when she was 16, sponsored by California poet George Sterling. She was a 1931 honors graduate of the University of Washington. After college she traveled through Asia.

She married poet and novelist Joseph Auslander in 1932 and moved to New York City, where he taught at Columbia. They moved to Washington, D.C., when Auslander was appointed the first Poet Laureate Consultant in poetry of the Library of Congress; they lived at 3117 35th Street Northwest, Washington, D.C., in the Cathedral Heights neighborhood. She subsequently collaborated with him on the novels My Uncle Jan and The Islanders.
They spent their last years living in Coral Gables, Florida.

Her work appeared in Harper's, and Poetry magazine.
Their papers are held at the University of Miami.

Works
Poetry
 The House of Silk (1927)
 Bright Ambush (1934, winner of the 1935 Pulitzer Prize for Poetry)
 The Seven Sins (1935)
 Splendour in the Grass (1936)
 Testament of Love (1938)
Fiction
 My Uncle Jan (1945) with Joseph Auslander
 The Islanders (1951) with Joseph Auslander

References

External links

 Oxford Companion to American Literature 
 New York Times Obituary 
 

1911 births
1960 deaths
American women poets
Writers from Seattle
University of Washington alumni
Pulitzer Prize for Poetry winners
Writers from Coral Gables, Florida
20th-century American poets
20th-century American women writers